The Omaha Quartermaster Depot Historic District, including several brick structures built in Italianate and other styles, was built for the U.S. Army between 1881 and 1894. Located in South Omaha between Hickory and 22nd Streets, Woolworth Avenue and the Union Pacific Railroad main line in Omaha, Nebraska, the depot was listed on the National Register of Historic Places as a historic district in 1979.  The depot previously operated as United States Army Reserve facility.  The facility is considered surplus by the GSA and was put up for auction in the fall of 2013.

History
In 1892, the depot commissary from Fort Leavenworth, Kansas, moved to Omaha. The U.S. Army's Department of the Platte used the depot as a storage and distribution source for military outposts for 20 years, including its peak activity during World War I. During that period, the depot supplied camps and National Guard units throughout the Midwest.

During the Great Depression, the depot was activated as part of Franklin D. Roosevelt's New Deal program as a supply base for Civilian Conservation Corps camps across the United States. The depot previously operated as United States Army Reserve facility.  On November 19, 2013, the property was put up for auction by the General Services Administration.

References

External links

Quartermaster Depot Historic District photo.

History of United States expansionism
Omaha Quartermaster Depot
National Register of Historic Places in Omaha, Nebraska
Historic districts in Omaha, Nebraska
Military history of the United States during World War I
Military installations in Nebraska
Landmarks in South Omaha, Nebraska
Civilian Conservation Corps in Nebraska
Buildings and structures in Omaha, Nebraska
Military facilities on the National Register of Historic Places in Nebraska
Historic districts on the National Register of Historic Places in Nebraska